Singanallur Assembly Constituency is a legislative Constituency of Coimbatore district, Tamil Nadu. Its State Assembly Constituency number is 121. It contains 18 wards of the Coimbatore which include the neighborhood of Singanallur . The important landmarks of the Constituency are Coimbatore International Airport, Singanallur Bus Terminus, Sungam lake area, Boat House, TIDEL Park Coimbatore and ESI Medical College Hospital. It is a part of the Coimbatore Lok Sabha constituency. It is one of the 234 State Legislative Assembly Constituencies in Tamil Nadu, in India.

Members of the Legislative Assembly

Election Results

2021

2016

2011

2006

2001

1996

1991

1989

1984

1980

1977

1971

References 

 

Assembly constituencies of Tamil Nadu
Coimbatore district